Tetyana Yakybchuk , (Russian: Татьяна Михайловна Якибчук),(born 21 November 1968) is a Paralympian track and field athlete from Ukraine competing mainly in throwing events.

She competed in the 2004 Summer Paralympics in Athens, Greece. There she won a silver medal in the women's F32-34/52/53 shot put event; however, she failed to medal in either the discus or javelin.

She competed in the 2008 Summer Paralympics in Beijing, China. There she won a gold medal in the women's F32-34/51/53 discus throw event. However, she failed to win a medal in attempting to defend her shot put title.

References

External links
 

Living people
1968 births
Paralympic athletes of Ukraine
Athletes (track and field) at the 2008 Summer Paralympics
Athletes (track and field) at the 2004 Summer Paralympics
Paralympic gold medalists for Ukraine
Paralympic silver medalists for Ukraine
World record holders in Paralympic athletics
Medalists at the 2004 Summer Paralympics
Medalists at the 2008 Summer Paralympics
Paralympic medalists in athletics (track and field)
Ukrainian female discus throwers
Ukrainian female shot putters
Recipients of the Honorary Diploma of the Cabinet of Ministers of Ukraine